Georges Izard (17 June 1903, in Abeilhan, Hérault – 20 September 1973, in Paris) was a French politician, lawyer, journalist and essayist.

Biography
Izard was named chief of staff to Charles Daniélou, then the minister of the merchant marine, whose daughter he married in 1929. ON 26 April 1936, he was elected member of parliament as a candidate of the Frontist Party in Meurthe-et-Moselle against a candidate of the extreme-right, Pierre Amidieu du Clos.

In 1940, as a volunteer soldier, he was taken as a prisoner of war by the Germans. Released for reasons of health, he joined the resistance as part of the Organisation civile et militaire (OCM). From November 1944, he was a member of Provisional Consultative Assembly Constituent Assembly of the Fourth Republic. He was Secretary-General of the OCM from 1945 to 1948. He then pursued a successful legal career. In November 1971 he was named to the Académie française.

Izard died on 20 September 1973.

Works 
La Pensée de Charles Péguy (with Emmanuel Mounier and Marcel Péguy, 1931)
Où va le communisme ? L'évolution du parti communiste. Les textes (1936)
La Bataille de la France (Avec André Deléage, Georges Duveau, Jules Roman et L.-E. Galeÿ, 1938)
Les Classes moyennes (1938)
Les Coulisses de la Convention (1939)
Principes de droit civil, Cours professé à l'École supérieure d'organisation professionnelle (1944)
L'Homme est révolutionnaire (1945)
Principes de droit civil, Cours professé à l'École nationale d'organisation économique et sociale (1946)
Viol d'un mausolée, le sens et l'avenir de la déstalinisation (1957)
Lettre affligée au général de Gaulle (1964)
Sainte Catherine de Gênes et l'au-delà (1969)

References

External links 
Académie française

1903 births
1973 deaths
People from Hérault
Politicians from Occitania (administrative region)
Frontist Party politicians
Members of the 16th Chamber of Deputies of the French Third Republic
20th-century French lawyers
French male essayists
Members of the Académie Française
French military personnel of World War II
French Resistance members
20th-century French essayists
20th-century French journalists
20th-century French male writers